Adrien Guillonnet (born 21 November 1993) is a French cyclist, who currently rides for UCI Continental team .

Major results

2018
 4th Overall Tour Alsace
1st  Mountains classification
 5th Tour du Gévaudan Occitanie
2019
 1st  Overall Tour de Guadeloupe
1st  Points classification
1st Stage 6
 9th Overall Tour of Japan

References

External links

1993 births
Living people
French male cyclists